Prionoxystus piger, the baccharis carpenterworm moth, is a moth in the family Cossidae. It was described by Augustus Radcliffe Grote in 1865. It is found in Florida and Cuba.

Adults have been recorded on wing from February to April in Florida.

The larvae bore in the main stem of Baccharis species.

References

Cossinae
Moths described in 1865